Elk Basin is a valley on the border of Montana and Wyoming in the United States.  It is an active oil field with hundreds of derricks operating in it.  Geologically, it is a breached anticline formed by a deep subsurface thrust fault.  Most of the rocks at the surface are Cretaceous in age, including the Lance Formation, Meeteetse Formation, Mesaverde Formation, Cody Shale, and Frontier Formation.

Teaching Geology
As the rock strata in the basin are mostly exposed and relatively easy to identify, Elk Basin has long been used as a place for geology students to learn to practice geologic mapping.  Often mapping classes are supported by the Yellowstone Bighorn Research Association, located in Red Lodge, Montana.

References

Landforms of Carbon County, Montana
Landforms of Montana
Landforms of Park County, Wyoming
Valleys of Wyoming
Oil fields in Wyoming